Olszówka  is a village in the administrative district of Gmina Łopuszno, within Kielce County, Świętokrzyskie Voivodeship, in south-central Poland.

The village has a population of 96.

References

Villages in Kielce County